The surname Burns has several origins. In some cases, it derived from the Middle English or Scots burn, and originated as a topographic name for an individual who lived by a stream. In other cases the surname is a variant form of the surname Burnhouse, which originated as a habitational name, derived from a place name made up of the word elements burn and house. In other cases the surname Burns originated as a nickname meaning "burn house". In other cases, the surname Burns is an Anglicised form of the Irish Ó Broin, which means "descendant of Bran". In some cases the surname Burns is an Americanized form of the Jewish surname Bernstein, which is derived from the German bernstein ("amber").

An early form of the surname when derived from the place name Burnhouse is "Burnis", recorded in 1526. An early form of the surname when derived from a nickname meaning "burn house" is "Brenhus", recorded in 1286 and 1275.

List of notable persons with the surname Burns

A
Aaron Burns (born 1985), American film producer and actor
Adrian Burns (born 1971), Australian rules footballer
Agnes Burns (1762–1834), Scottish social figure
A. K. Burns (born 1975), American artist
Alan Burns (disambiguation), multiple people
Albert Burns (disambiguation), multiple people
Alayna Burns (born 1980), Australian cyclist
Alec Burns (1907–2003), English track and field athlete
Alec Burns (cricketer) (born 1948), Trinidadian cricketer
Alex Burns (disambiguation), multiple people
Alistair Burns (born 1964), English curler
Allan Burns (disambiguation), multiple people
Allen Burns (1870–1925), Australian rules footballer
Andréa Burns (born 1971), American actress and singer
Andrew Burns (disambiguation), multiple people
Andy Burns (born 1990), American baseball player
Angela Burns, British politician and businesswoman
Anna Burns (born 1962), Northern Irish author
Anne Burns (1915–2001), British engineer and pilot
Anne Burns (linguist), Welsh-Australian linguist
Anthony Burns (disambiguation), multiple people
Antoine Burns (born 1979), American football player
Archibald Burns (disambiguation), multiple people
Archibaldo Burns (1914–2011), Mexican film director and writer
Arnold Burns (1930–2013), American lawyer
Arthur Burns (disambiguation), multiple people
Artie Burns (born 1995), American football player

B
Barnabas Burns (1817–1883), American politician and soldier
Barnet Burns (1805–1860), English sailor
Barry Burns, Scottish musician
Bart Burns (1918–2007), American actor
Beatrice Burns (1906–1988), American political figure
Ben Burns (1913–2000), American publisher
Benedict Delisle Burns (1915–2001), British neurophysiologist
Berta Burns (1893–1972), New Zealand journalist and activist
Beth Burns (born 1957), American basketball coach
Beverly Burns (born 1949), American aviator
Bill Burns (disambiguation), multiple people
Billy Burns (disambiguation), multiple people
Billy Joe Burns (born 1989), Northern Irish footballer
Bob Burns (disambiguation), multiple people
Bobby Burns (disambiguation), multiple people
Braidon Burns (born 1996), Australian rugby league footballer
Breehn Burns, American screenwriter
Brenda Burns (born 1950), American politician
Brendon Burns (disambiguation), multiple people
Brent Burns (born 1985), Canadian hockey player
Brian Burns (disambiguation), multiple people
Britt Burns (born 1959), American baseball player
Brooke Burns (born 1978), American model and actor
Bruce Burns (born 1952), American politician
Bryant Burns (born 1929), Australian politician
Burnie Burns (born 1973), American writer and filmmaker
Burton Burns (born 1952), American football coach

C
Carol Burns (1947–2015), Australian actor
Carolyn Burns (born 1942), New Zealand ecologist
Casey Burns (born 1975), American illustrator
Catherine Burns (1945–2019), American actress
Catherine Lloyd Burns (born 1961), American actress and writer
C. B. Burns (1879–1968), American baseball player
C. Delisle Burns (1879–1942), English writer
Cha Burns (1957–2007), Scottish guitarist
Charles Burns (disambiguation), multiple people
Chris Burns (disambiguation), multiple people
Christian Burns (born 1974), British musician
Christian Burns (basketball) (born 1985), Italian-American basketball player
Christine Burns (born 1954), British political activist
Clarence H. Burns (1918–2003), American politician
Clinton Sumner Burns (1871–1924), American civil engineer
Colin Burns (born 1982), American soccer player
Conrad Burns (1935–2016), American politician
Cory Burns (born 1987), American baseball player
Creighton Burns (1925–2008), Australian journalist
Curry Burns (born 1981), American football player

D
Dan Burns (born 1988), American lacrosse player
Darin Burns (born 1964), Canadian football player
Darren Burns (rugby league) (born 1974), Australian rugby league footballer
Dave Burns (football manager), Dutch-British football coach
Dave Burns (sportscaster) (born 1963), American sportscaster
David Burns (disambiguation), multiple people
Dawson Burns (1828–1909), English minister
DeChon Burns (born 1970), American football coach
Declan Burns (born 1956), Irish canoeist
Denis Burns (born 1952), Irish hurling manager
Dennis Burns (1898–1968), American baseball player
Deondre Burns (born 1997), American basketball player
DeWayne Burns (born 1972), American politician
Diann Burns (born 1958), American news anchor
Dick Burns (1863–1937), American baseball player
Dominic Burns (born 1983), English film director
Donald Burns (1921–1987), New Zealand cricket umpire
Donnie Burns (born 1959), British dancer
Draelon Burns (born 1985), American basketball player
Duncan Burns, British wrestler

E
Éamonn Burns (born 1972), Irish Gaelic footballer
Éamonn Burns (Down Gaelic footballer) (1963–2019), Irish Gaelic footballer and manager
Ed Burns (disambiguation), multiple people
Eddie Burns (1916–2004), Australian rugby league footballer
Edmund Burns (1892–1980), American actor
Edward Burns (disambiguation), multiple people
Eileen Burns (born 1989), Irish cyclist
Eleanor Burns (born 1945), American quilter
Elinor Burns (1887–1978), British suffragist
Elizabeth Burns (disambiguation), multiple people
Ellen Bree Burns (1923–2019), American judge
E. L. M. Burns (1897–1985), Canadian Army officer and diplomat
Emelia Burns (born 1982), Australian actress
Emile Burns (1889–1972), British author and economist
Emmett C. Burns Jr. (1940-2022), American politician
Eric Burns (born 1945), American media critic
Erin Burns (born 1988), Australian cricketer
Eugene Burns (??–1958), American war correspondent
Eveline M. Burns (1900–1985), British-American economist
Evers Burns (born 1971), American basketball player

F
Farmer Burns (baseball) (1876–??), American baseball player
F. C. Burns (1890–1915), American football player and businessman
Findley Burns Jr. (1917–2003), American ambassador
Frances E. Burns (1866-1937), American social leader and business executive
Francis Burns (disambiguation), multiple people
Frank Burns (disambiguation), multiple people
Frankie Burns (1889–1961), American boxer
Fred Burns (1889–1971), American tennis player
Fred Burns (actor) (1878–1955), American actor
Freddie Burns (born 1990), English rugby union footballer
Frederick William Burns (1860–1923), American sports announcer

G
Gene Burns (1940–2013), American radio host
George Burns (disambiguation), multiple people
Gerald Burns (1940–1997), American poet
Gerard M. Burns (born 1961), Scottish painter
Gilbert Burns (born 1986), Brazilian mixed martial artist
Gilbert Burns (farmer) (1760–1827), Scottish farmer
Gill Burns (born 1964), English rugby union footballer
Glenn Burns (born 1952), American meteorologist
Gordon Burns (born 1942), Northern Irish broadcaster
Gordon Burns (footballer) (born 1978), Scottish footballer
Graeme Burns (born 1971), Scottish rugby union footballer and coach
Graham Burns (born 1966), British canoeist
Greg Burns (disambiguation), multiple people
Gregory Burns (born 1957), American athlete

H
Harold Burns (disambiguation), multiple people
Harriet Burns (1928–2008), American artist
Harry Burns (disambiguation), multiple people
Helen Burns (1916–2018), English actress
Henry Burns (disambiguation), multiple people
Herbert Burns (born 1988), Brazilian mixed martial artist
Howard Burns (born 1939), British professor
Hugh Burns (disambiguation), multiple people

I
Ian Burns (1939–2015), Scottish footballer
Ian Burns (snooker player) (born 1985), English snooker player
Inez Brown Burns (1886–1976), American socialite
Irene Burns, American television producer
Isaac Burns (1869–1946), British trade unionist
Isabella Burns (1771–1858), Scottish publisher
Islay Burns (1817–1872), Scottish theologian

J
Jabez Burns (1805–1876), English philosopher
Jack Burns (disambiguation), multiple people
Jackie Burns (born 1980), American actress
Jackson Burns (1956–2016), American stunt performer
Jacob Burns (disambiguation), multiple people
Jacqueline Burns (born 1997), Northern Irish footballer
Jaira Burns (born 1997), American singer-songwriter
Jake Burns (born 1958), Irish musician
Jake Burns (rugby union) (born 1941), New Zealand rugby union footballer
James Burns (disambiguation), multiple people
Jarlath Burns (born 1968), Irish Gaelic footballer
Jason Burns (American football) (born 1972), American football player
Jean Burns (1919–2019), Australian aviator
Jennifer Burns, American politician
Jerry Burns (1927–2021), American football player and coach
Jessie Burns, British musician
Jessie Burns (Canadian musician), Canadian musician
J. Frederick Burns, American politician
J. H. Burns (1921–2012), Scottish historian
Jim Burns (disambiguation), multiple people
J. Irving Burns (1843–1925), American lawyer and politician
Jock Burns (1894–1963), Scottish footballer
Joel Burns (disambiguation), multiple people
John Burns (disambiguation), multiple people
Jon G. Burns (born 1952), American politician
Jordan Burns (born 1997), American basketball player
Jordyn Burns (born 1992), American ice hockey player
Joseph Burns (disambiguation), multiple people
Josh Burns (born 1978), American mixed martial artist
Josh Burns (politician) (born 1987), Australian politician
Joy S. Burns, American corporate executive
J. Stewart Burns (born 1969), American television writer

K
Karen Burns (disambiguation), multiple people
Karl Burns (born 1958), British musician
Karla Burns (1954–2021), American soprano
Kat Burns, Canadian musician
Kay Burns, Canadian artist
Keith Burns (disambiguation), multiple people
Kennedy Francis Burns (1842–1895), Canadian businessman and politician
Kenneth Burns (disambiguation), multiple people
Kevin Burns (disambiguation), multiple people
Kida Burns (born 2002), American hip-hop dancer
Kieran Burns (born 1992), Scottish footballer
Killian Burns (born 1975), Irish Gaelic footballer
Kit Burns (1831–1870), American sportsman
Kodi Burns (born 1988), American football coach
Krysta Burns (born 1996), Canadian curler

L
Lamont Burns (born 1974), American football player
Larry Burns (disambiguation), multiple people
Laura Burns (disambiguation), multiple people
Lauren Burns (born 1974), Australian taekwondo practitioner
Lauri Burns, American writer and philanthropist
Lawton Burns (born 1951), American business theorist
Lenny Burns, British singer
Leon Burns (1942–1984), American football player
Leopoldina Burns (1855–1942), American missionary
Les Burns (1920–2015), Australian rules footballer
Liam Burns (born 1978), Northern Irish footballer
Liam Burns (NUS president) (born 1984), British union leader
Lindsay Burns (born 1965), American rower
Lindy Burns, Australian radio presenter
Lizzie Burns (1827–1878), Irish political figure
Lloyd Burns (born 1984), Welsh rugby union footballer
Loree Griffin Burns, American author
Louis Burns (disambiguation), multiple people
Louisa Burns (1869–1958), American physician
Louise Burns (born 1985), Canadian singer-songwriter
Lucy Burns (1879–1966), American suffragist
Luke F. Burns (1881-1956), American lawyer and politician

M
Malcolm Burns (1910–1986), New Zealand agriculturalist
M. Anthony Burns (born 1942), American businessman
Marc Burns (born 1983), Trinidadian athlete
Margaret Burns (1769–1792), Scottish prostitute
Marge Burns (1925–2009), American professional golfer
Margo Burns, American historian
Marilyn Burns (disambiguation), multiple people
Marion Burns (1907–1993), American actress
Marjorie Burns (born 1940), English literary scholar
Mark Burns (disambiguation), multiple people
Marsha Burns (born 1945), American photographer
Martha Burns (born 1957), Canadian actress
Martin Burns (1861–1937), American wrestler
Marvin Burns (1928–1990), American water polo player
Mary Burns (disambiguation), multiple people
Matthew James Burns (born 1985), Scottish record producer
Max Burns (born 1948), American politician
Megan Burns (born 1986), English musician and actor
Michael Burns (disambiguation), multiple people
M. Michele Burns (born 1958), American businesswoman
Morgan Burns (born 1993), American football player
M. W. Burns (born 1958), American sound artist

N
Nathan Burns (born 1988), Australian footballer
Neal Burns (1892–1969), American actor
Neil Burns (born 1965), English cricketer
Neil Burns (footballer) (born 1945), Scottish footballer
Nellie Marie Burns (1850–1897), American actor and poet
Nica Burns (born 1954), British theatre producer
Nicholas Burns (disambiguation), multiple people
Norm Burns (1918–1995), Canadian ice hockey player

O
Olive Ann Burns (1924–1990), American writer
Otto L. Burns (1868–1941), American politician
Otway Burns (1775–1850), American privateer
Owen Burns (disambiguation), multiple people
Oyster Burns (1864–1928), American baseball player

P
Paddy Burns (1881–1943), New Zealand rugby union footballer
Patrick Burns (disambiguation), multiple people
Patti Burns (1952–2001), American journalist
Paul Burns (disambiguation), multiple people
Pauline Powell Burns (1872–1912), American pianist and artist
Pete Burns (1959–2016), English musician
Peter Burns (disambiguation), multiple people

R
Ralph Burns (1922–2001), American pianist
Randal Burns, American computer scientist
Randy Burns (born 1948), American singer-songwriter
Raymond Burns (disambiguation), multiple people
Rebecca Burns, American journalist
Red Burns (1925–2013), Canadian-American academic
Regan Burns (born 1968), American actor
Rex Burns (born 1935), American author
Ric Burns (born 1955), American documentary filmmaker and writer
Richard Burns (1971–2005), English rally driver
Ricky Burns (born 1983), Scottish boxer
R. Nicholas Burns (born 1956), American politician
Rob Burns (born 1953), New Zealand bass player
Robert Burns (disambiguation), multiple people
Ronald Burns (athlete) (1903–1985), Indian sprinter
Ronnie Burns (disambiguation), multiple people
Rory Burns (born 1990), English cricketer
Roy Burns (disambiguation), multiple people
Ryan Burns (born 1992), Northern Irish footballer

S
Sam Burns (born 1996), American golfer
Samuel Burns (born 1982), American rower
Sarah Burns (disambiguation), multiple people
Scott Burns (disambiguation), multiple people
Sean Burns (footballer) (born 1991), Scottish footballer
Shauna Burns, American singer-songwriter
Shernyl Burns (born 1991), West Indian cricketer
Sheryl Burns, New Zealand netball player
Silas Reese Burns (1855–1940), American architect
Síle Burns (born 1985), Irish camogie player
Simon Burns (born 1952), British politician
Stephan W. Burns (1954–1990), American actor
Stephanie Burns (born 1955), American chemist
Stephen Burns (disambiguation), multiple people
Steve Burns (disambiguation), multiple people
Stewart Burns (born 1899), Scottish golfer
Sylvia Burns (born 1955), South African lawn bowler

T
Tanner Burns (born 1998), American baseball player
Tara Burns (fl. 1990s–2020s), Irish judge
Ted Burns (1889–1972), Australian rules footballer
Terry Burns (disambiguation), multiple people
Thea Burns, American art conservator
Theobald M. Burns (1862–1926), Canadian merchant and politician
Thomas Burns (disambiguation), multiple people
Tim Burns (disambiguation), multiple people
Tito Burns (1921–2010), British musician
Todd Burns (born 1963), American baseball player
Tommy Burns (disambiguation), multiple people
Tony Burns (born 1944), English footballer
Tosher Burns (1902–1984), Irish footballer
T. P. Burns (1924–2018), Irish jockey
Travis Burns (disambiguation), multiple people
Trevor Burns (born 2001), American soccer player

U
Ursula Burns (born 1958), American businesswoman

V
Veronica Burns (1914–1998), Irish museum curator

W
Waller Thomas Burns (1858–1917), American judge
Walter Noble Burns (1866–1932), American author
Wes Burns (born 1994), Welsh footballer
W. Haydon Burns (1912–1987), American politician
W. Haywood Burns (1940–1996), American lawyer and activist
Wilfred Burns (born 1990), British composer
Wilfred Burns (town planner) (1923–1984), British town planner
William Burns (disambiguation), multiple people
Willie Burns (1916–1966), American baseball player
Willis B. Burns (1851–1915), American businessman and politician

Z
Zachary Burns (born 1996), American rower

Fictional characters
Mr. Burns, a character in the television series The Simpsons; he is Homer's manager and an evil person
Eunice Burns, a character in the film What's Up, Doc?
Sir Isambard Burns, a character in Raymond Postgate's novel Verdict of Twelve

See also
Berns (surname), a page with people with the given surname "Berns"
Governor Burns (disambiguation), a disambiguation page with Governors surnamed "Burns"
Lord Burns (disambiguation), a disambiguation page with Lords surnamed "Burns"
Senator Burns (disambiguation), a disambiguation page with Senators surnamed "Burns"

References

Anglicised Irish-language surnames 
English-language surnames
Surnames of English origin
Surnames of Lowland Scottish origin
Surnames of Ulster-Scottish origin
English toponymic surnames